The eastern alpine mannikin (Lonchura monticola) or alpine munia, is a species of estrildid finch native to the Papuan Peninsula. It has an estimated global extent of occurrence of 20,000 to 50,000 km2.

It is found in subtropical/ tropical high altitude grassland habitat. The status of the species is evaluated as Least Concern.

References

BirdLife Species Factsheet

eastern alpine mannikin
Birds of the Papuan Peninsula
eastern alpine mannikin